Arnia is a town and a notified area committee in Jammu district  in the union territory of Jammu and Kashmir, India.

Geography
It has an average elevation of 269 metres (882 feet).

Demographics
 India census, Arnia had a population of 9057. Males constitute 52% of the population and females 48%. Arnia has an average literacy rate of 65%, higher than the national average of 59.5%; with 57% of the males and 43% of females literate. 12% of the population is under 6 years of age.

Religion
Hindu 98.64%, Sikh 0.55%, and Christian 0.47%.

Border conflicts
In recent years, Arnia has been subject to ceasefire violations by Pakistan which has led to the killing of civilians and the destruction of villagers' properties.

References

Cities and towns in Jammu district